The ornamental orchid species Phalaenopsis hieroglyphica is native to certain islands of the Philippines. Its flowers are creamy white with transverse markings that resemble glyphs. Through hybridization, growers have successfully created flowers with different shapes and colors while retaining the glyphs. Since 1975, the species has been protected under Appendix II of the Convention on International Trade in Endangered Species of Wild Fauna and Flora (CITES).

Growth, habitat and cultivation 

Commonly P. hieroglyphica blooms in spring, with three to four star-shaped flowers that open simultaneously and last two to three months; a well-established specimen with keikis can produce more than 50 flowers. Their fragrance is said to be faintly rose-like or strongly citrus-like. The background of the flower can be white to ochre, sometimes with a tinge of green at the tips, and the glyphs on the sepals and stamens can be cinnamon or a purple hue. The flowers are comparatively larger and the glyphs more pronounced than those of P. lueddemanniana. The characteristic glyphs are retained in P. hieroglyphica hybrids.

As a monopodial epiphyte, it is found growing on and hanging down from trees in shady locations on the islands of Polillo, Palawan, Mindanao (in Surigao del Norte and Surigao del Sur) and Luzon at elevations below . Of its genus, this species grows in the coolest and deeply shady locations of humid forests. Not much is known about its natural habitat, including its pollinators.

The species was first cultivated in England by Hugh Low & Company from a specimen delivered by collector William Boxall in 1887.

Since 1975 this species has been considered vulnerable to extinction and listed in Appendix II of the Convention on International Trade in Endangered Species of Wild Fauna and Flora (CITES). To protect against overcollection, an export permit is required in international trade of specimens taken from their natural habitat. Protection from loss and degradation of the natural habitat are also concerns.

Taxonomy 
The accepted synonym Phalaenopsis lueddemanniana var. hieroglyphica reflects its naming in 1887 by German orchidologist H. G. Reichenbach. In 1969, American botanist H. R. Sweet elevated its ranking to species. The accepted synonym Polychilos hieroglyphica is traced to Malaysian botanist Shim in 1982.

The morphological characteristics of P. hieroglyphica reported by H. R. Sweet  and Eric A. Christenson point to species classification and intragenus relationships confirmed by DNA analysis findings published in 2009.

Anatomy of Phalaenopsis 

In the epiphytes of Phalaenopsis, moisture is stored primarily in the leaves and photosynthesis-generating sugar primarily in the fleshy roots. In Phalaenopsis species with horizontal stems, such as P. hieroglyphica, the leaves are pendant and grow downward to drain rainwater away from the plant. The reproductive organ is the column, found between the two largest petals of Phalaenopsis orchids. The lip, connected to the flower by the column, aids in pollination. The lip in all Phalaenopsis orchids has three lobes, as depicted in a general orchid flower diagram (left). In the seminal work Fertilisation of Orchids, Charles Darwin detailed these and other observable characteristics of orchid specimens, including Phalaenopsis species, to determine biological mechanisms of species adaptation, survival and ecological relationships.

Pedicel and ovary: up to 0.75 inch long

References

Notes

Further reading 
 Boosey, Jane. 2007. 300 Orchids: Species, Hybrids and Varieties in Cultivation. Buffalo, NY (USA) and Ontario, Canada: Firefly Books Ltd. . See p406 for brief morphology.
 Cootes, Jim. 2001. The Orchids of The Philippines. Portland, OR (USA): Timber Press, Inc. . See p156 for brief morphology.

External links 
 
 
 Varieties of Phalaenopsis hieroglyphica
 Picsearch images
 Epidendra: The Global Orchid Taxonomic Network (at the University of Costa Rica)

hieroglyphica
Orchids of the Philippines